, known professionally as Tao, is a Japanese actress and model, who is alongside Ai Tominaga and Hiroko Matsumoto, one of the biggest models from Japan. In 2009, she was one of the faces of Ralph Lauren.

She made her film debut as the female lead Mariko Yashida in the 2013 film The Wolverine; and played Mercy Graves in the 2016 film Batman v Superman: Dawn of Justice. She has had recurring roles in the television series Hannibal, The Man in the High Castle and Westworld.

Early life 
Tao was born in Chiba, Japan. She started modeling as a teenager in Japan, when she was 14 years old.

Career
In 2006, she made a decision to move to Paris and develop her career on an international level. Soon after that, Tao made her debut on the European runways, one of the few prominent East Asian models of that era. She has modelled for brands including Alexander Wang, Chanel, Dolce & Gabbana, Fendi, Louis Vuitton, Michael Kors, Miu Miu, Ralph Lauren, and Yves Saint Laurent.

In 2009, Tao moved to New York City.

Tao has worked in advertising and editorial projects. She has fronted campaigns such as Dolce & Gabbana with Mario Testino, Emporio Armani by Alasdair McLellan, Kenzo with Mario Sorrenti, and Tommy Hilfiger with Craig McDean. Editorially, she has shot for i-D Magazine, V Magazine, W Magazine, and various international editions of Harper's Bazaar and Vogue.

The November 2009 issue of Vogue Nippon (Japanese Vogue) is dedicated to Tao. She was the Japan Fashion Editor's Club "Model of the Year" and was one of Vogue Nippon's "Women of the Year" in 2010.

In 2013, Tao made her film debut as Mariko Yashida, opposite Hugh Jackman, in The Wolverine. In October 2014, it was announced that she had joined the cast of Hannibal as Chiyoh, Hannibal Lecter's family servant.

In January 2015, it was announced that Tao would star in the film Crossroads with Alodia Gosiengfiao. In 2015, Tao appeared in The Man in the High Castle as Betty Kasoura, wife of lawyer Paul Kasoura and a customer at Robert Childan's American Artistic Handcrafts. In 2016, Tao played Mercy Graves in the film Batman v Superman: Dawn of Justice.

Modeling
Okamoto has modeled for Alexander McQueen, Alexander Wang, Burberry Prorsum, Bottega Veneta, Chanel, Dolce & Gabbana, Donna Karan, Emanuel Ungaro, Fendi, Giorgio Armani, Givenchy, Hermès, Jean-Paul Gaultier, Kenzo, Louis Vuitton, Marc Jacobs, Maison Martin Margiela, Max Mara, Miu Miu, Moschino, Paul Smith, Phillip Lim, Ralph Lauren, Salvatore Ferragamo, Tommy Hilfiger, Vivienne Westwood, Yves Saint Laurent and more.

Personal life
In 2015, Okamoto married Tenzin Wild, the Co-Editor-in-Chief of The Last Magazine.

Filmography

References

External links
 

1985 births
Living people
Japanese female models
Japanese film actresses
People from Chiba (city)
21st-century Japanese actresses
The Society Management models